Schirmann is a German surname. Notable people with the surname include:

Richard Schirrmann (1874–1961), German teacher and hostel pioneer
Hayyim Schirmann (1904–1981), Jewish scholar

See also
Schiemann
Schirman
Schürmann

German-language surnames